Lesley Glaister (born 4 October 1956,) is a British novelist, poet and playwright. She has written 15 novels, Blasted Things (2020) being the most recent, one play and numerous short stories and radio plays. She is a lecturer in creative writing at the University of St Andrews, and is a regular contributor of book  reviews to The Spectator and The Times. She is married to poet Andrew Greig.

Her subject matter is often serious (murder, madness and obsession crop up regularly in her books) but with a thread of dark humour running through it. Her first novel Honour Thy Father (1990) won the Somerset Maugham Award and a Betty Trask Award, Now You See Me was shortlisted for the Orange Prize for fiction in 2002, and  Easy Peasy was shortlisted for the Guardian Fiction Prize in  1998. Little Egypt, published in 2014, won a Jerwood Fiction Uncovered Prize. Her first play, Bird Calls, was performed at the Crucible Theatre, Sheffield, in 2003.

Glaister is a Fellow of the Royal Society of Literature. She is currently writer in residence at the University of Edinburgh.

Bibliography
 Honour Thy Father (1990)
 Trick or Treat (1990)
 Digging to Australia (1992)
 Limestone and Clay (1993)
 Partial Eclipse (1994)
 The Private Parts of Women (1996)
 Easy Peasy (1998)
 Sheer Blue Bliss (1999)
 Now You See Me (2001)
 As Far as You Can Go (2004)
 Nina Todd Has Gone (2007)
 Chosen (2010)
 Little Egypt (2014)
 The Squeeze (2017)
 Blasted Things (2020)

References

External links
 Lesley Glaister's website
 Lesley Glaister
 

English women novelists
English women dramatists and playwrights
1956 births
Living people
Fellows of the Royal Society of Literature
Academics of Sheffield Hallam University
People from Wellingborough